Qaem Amrohvi 
(), was an Urdu poet, philosopher and thinker.

Qaem Amrohvi's real name was Syed Zariful Hasan. He was born in 1919 in Amroha, India.  After the independence of Pakistan in 1947,  he migrated to Pakistan. He belonged to the Naqvi Syed family. In 1974, he moved to Kuwait and settled there. During the days of Gulf War, he moved back to Pakistan. He died in 1990 in Karachi.

See also
Amroha

1919 births
1990 deaths
Pakistani male poets
Urdu-language poets from Pakistan
People from Amroha
Pakistani Shia Muslims
Muhajir people
Poets from Karachi
20th-century Pakistani poets
Indian emigrants to Pakistan